Peter Durber (1873–1963) was an English footballer who played in the Football League for Glossop North End and Stoke. He played in the Southern League for Southampton with whom he played in the 1900 FA Cup Final, beating three First division clubs along the way.

Football career
Durber was born in Stoke-upon-Trent and played for Audley Town before joining Stoke in 1896. He played in two season under Horace Austerberry before leaving for Southampton in 1898. Durber was a defender who was part of Southampton's 1899 Southern League Championship winning team, and a finalist in the 1900 F.A. Cup final when the Saints were beaten 4–0 by Bury at the Crystal Palace. In May 2010, it was announced that his 1900 FA Cup runners-up medal and 1899 Southern League championship medal were to be sold at auction. The FA Cup Final medal was sold for £2,400.

He returned to Stoke in August 1900 and played 35 times in the 1900–01 season. He them spent a season with Glossop North End before enjoying a six-year spell at Northampton Town.

Career statistics
Source:

Honours
Southampton
 Southern League Championship 1898–99
 FA Cup finalist: 1900

References

1873 births
1963 deaths
Footballers from Stoke-on-Trent
English footballers
Association football fullbacks
Stoke City F.C. players
Southampton F.C. players
Glossop North End A.F.C. players
Northampton Town F.C. players
Southern Football League players
English Football League players
FA Cup Final players